Antrosagittifera is a genus of worms belonging to the family Sagittiferidae.

Species:
 Antrosagittifera corallina Hooge & Tyler, 2001

References

Acoelomorphs